Ruggero Biancani (25 January 1915 – 6 February 1993) was an Italian versatile athlete (he was a discus thrower and high jumper), who competed at the 1936 Summer Olympics.

References

External links
 

1915 births
1993 deaths
Athletes (track and field) at the 1936 Summer Olympics
Italian male discus throwers
Italian male high jumpers
Olympic athletes of Italy
20th-century Italian people